Mithu Aur Aapa is a 2014 Pakistani comedy series aired on Hum TV from 7 April 2014 to 16 November 2014. It stars an assemble cast of Hina Dilpazeer, Saba Hameed, Shabbir Jan and Nadia Hussain.

Outline
The series explores the story of Mitthu (Hina Dilpazeer) who is a traditional and innocent woman. Her husband has discarded relationships with her and left her alone with ill son Baullay Munnay. Mithu starts living with her brother, but his wife Rehana  doesn't like Mitthu or her presence. Rehana makes difficulties for Mitthu and makes things complicated for her. Mitthu, along with performing daily house work, does a lot of other work, yet Rehana is not happy with her. Mithu tries to get treatment for Baullay Munnay, but gets further tense by their neighbor Aapa (Saba Hameed) who often visited Rehana's house and exploits Mitthu. Their fighting and gossiping, along with causing problems for Mitthu, creates a humorous situation in the house.

Cast
Hina Dilpazeer as Mitthu/Mithu
Saba Hameed as Aapa
Shabbir Jan as Mustaqeem
Nadia Hussain 
Badar Khalil as Aapa's mother-in-law
Shehnaz Pervaiz as Rehana
Minal Khan
Hira Sheikh
Waqar Hussain as Baullay Munnay

References

External links
Mithu Aur Aapa on Official website
 

2014 Pakistani television series debuts
2014 Pakistani television series endings
Pakistani drama television series